Mentheae is the largest tribe of plants in the family Lamiaceae. It includes herbs such as sage, hyssop, mint, bee balm and thyme.

Genera

Subtribe Lycopinae
 Lycopus (21 living species)
Subtribe Menthinae
 Acanthomintha
 Blephilia
 Bystropogon
 Clinopodium
 Conradina
 Cuminia
 Cunila
 Cyclotrichium
 Dicerandra
 Drymosiphon
 Eriothymus
 Glechon
 Gontscharovia
 Hedeoma
 Hesperozygis
 Hoehnea
 Killickia (treated as part of Micromeria by Harley et al. 2004)
 Kurzamra
 Mentha
 Micromeria
 Minthostachys
 Monarda
 Monardella
 Obtegomeria
 Origanum
 Pentapleura
 Piloblephis
 Pogogyne
 Poliomintha
 Pycnanthemum
 Rhabdocaulon
 Rhododon
 Saccocalyx
 Satureja
 Stachydeoma
 Thymbra
 Thymus
 Zataria
 Ziziphora
Subtribe Nepetinae
 Agastache
 Cedronella
 Dracocephalum
 Drepanocaryum
 Glechoma
 Heterolamium
 Hymenocrater
 Hyssopus
 Kudrjaschevia
 Lallemantia
 Lophanthus
 Marmoritis
 Meehania
 Nepeta
 Schizonepeta
Subtribe Prunellinae
 Cleonia
 Horminum
 Prunella
Subtribe Salviinae
 Chaunostoma
 Dorystaechas
 Lepechinia
 Melissa
 Meriandra
 Neoeplingia
 Salvia
 Zhumeria

Incertae sedis (uncertain placement):
 Acinos (treated as part of Clinopodium by Harley et al. 2004)

References

Asterid tribes
Lamiaceae